Russian Railways Cup was an annual pre-season football tournament, held in Moscow and hosted by FC Lokomotiv Moscow.

The first edition of the tournament took place in 2007. Dutch club PSV Eindhoven won the title after beating Real Madrid 2–1 in the final. PSV Eindhoven beat Italian team Milan 4–3 on penalties after a goalless draw, in the first semi-final, while Real Madrid managed to come back from two goals down after the first half to beat the hosts Lokomotiv Moscow 5–2. In the third place playoff, Milan scored twice in the last ten minutes to draw with Lokomotiv Moscow 3–3. The Italians went on to claim the third place after beating the Russian club 5–4 on penalties.

Results

 
Key:
aet — after extra time
ps — penalty shootout

See also
Amsterdam Tournament
Emirates Cup
Peace Cup
Barclays Asia Trophy

External links
Official website

Sports competitions in Moscow
Defunct international club association football competitions in Europe
Russian football friendly trophies